From December 2018 to January 2019 heavy clashes took place in Bakouma in Central African Republic.

Battle 
On 31 December 2018 FPRC and UPC rebels took control of Bakouma city after battle with Anti-balaka. They cut telephone networks and looted more than 90% of houses. They killed Madambari brothers, local Anti-balaka leaders. On 2 January 2019 MINUSCA forces entered town demanding withdrawal of militias. More than 12,000 people had to leave city to local forests and roads without any shelters. On 8 January 100 people in Bangassou protested against violence in Bakouma. On 16 January 2019 MINUSCA forces recaptured entire town with support of military and Anti-balaka militias forcing FPRC fighters to leave. They established temporary base in city to protect civilians. The last convoy left town at 5 am. On their withdrawal, FPRC fighters set fire to 40 houses.

References 

Central African Republic Civil War
January 2019 events in Africa
2019 in the Central African Republic
Battles in 2018
Battles in 2019